The Paul Revere-class attack transport was a ship class of attack transports of the United States Navy during the Cold War. Both ships were converted from the Type C4-S-1A cargo ships.

Development 
Two type C4 cargo ships were converted into attack transports for the United States Navy since the middle stages of the 1950s. Both ships were decommissioned on 1 January 1980 and later sold to the Spanish Navy in the same year.

The ship's hull remained nearly the same but with new equipment to carry out her purpose now placed on deck alongside several cranes. The ships' armaments had been slightly changed and relocated in order for the ships to carry out their new roles.

Ships in the class

References 

United States Navy. 1959-1991. Dictionary of American Naval Fighting Ships.
2002. U.S. Amphibious Ships and Craft: An Illustrated Design History. Annapolis: Naval Institute Press. .

New York Shipbuilding Corporation
Auxiliary ship classes of the United States Navy
Paul Revere-class attack transports